Eucalyptus glomerosa, commonly known as jinjulu, is a species of mallee that is endemic to inland Australia. It has rough, fibrous and flaky bark near the base, smooth bark above, egg-shaped to lance-shaped adult leaves, flower buds usually in groups of seven, cream-coloured flowers and conical to hemispherical fruit. It is mainly found in the Great Victoria Desert of South Australia but also grows in eastern parts of Western Australia.

Description
It has rough, fibrous to flaky bark near the base of the trunk, smooth coppery coloured bark above and on the branches. Flowering is spasmodic, depending on rainfall and the flowers are cream-coloured.

Taxonomy and naming
Eucalyptus glomerosa was first formally described in 1993 by Ian Brooker and Stephen Hopper from a specimen they collected north-east of Cosmo Newbery (Yilka) in 1984. The specific epithet is derived from the Latin word glomus, glomeris meaning "a ball of yarn" with the ending -osus meaning "abounding in", referring to the spherical buds.

Distribution and habitat
Jinjulu grows on sandplains and sand dunes and is often associated with other eucalypts including E. eremicola, E. gongylocarpa, E. gypsophila and E. mannensis. It is mainly found in the Great Victoria Desert but occurs within  of the Northern Territory border and in the central eastern areas of the Western Australia. The range includes the Central Ranges, Great Victoria Desert and Murchison biogeographic regions.

Conservation status
This mallee is classified as "not threatened" by the Western Australian Government Department of Parks and Wildlife.

See also
List of Eucalyptus species

References

Eucalypts of Western Australia
Flora of South Australia
glomerosa
Myrtales of Australia
Mallees (habit)
Plants described in 1993
Taxa named by Stephen Hopper
Taxa named by Ian Brooker